Takashi Nagai (born 19 October 1936) is a Japanese former wrestler who competed in the 1960 Summer Olympics.

References

1936 births
Living people
Olympic wrestlers of Japan
Wrestlers at the 1960 Summer Olympics
Japanese male sport wrestlers
Asian Games medalists in wrestling
Wrestlers at the 1958 Asian Games
Asian Games gold medalists for Japan
Medalists at the 1958 Asian Games
20th-century Japanese people
21st-century Japanese people